Carrizo Springs is the largest city in and the county seat of Dimmit County, Texas, United States. The population was 5,368 at the 2010 census. (2018 estimate 5,470).

The name of the town is derived from the local springs, which were named by the Spanish for the cane grass that once grew around them. It is the oldest town in Dimmit County. Artesian wells in the area are known for their pure, clean water. This water is often exported from Carrizo Springs for use as holy water.

History
Carrizo Springs lies along U.S. Route 83, about 82 miles northwest of Laredo and 45 miles north of the Mexican border. Route 83 intersects U.S. Route 277 there. The name "Carrizo Springs" derives from similarly named springs in the area; the name is Spanish for a type of grass once common in the area.  Founded in 1865 by settlers from Atascosa County, Carrizo Springs is the oldest community in the county.

Carrizo Springs, along with San Antonio, Uvalde, Crystal City, and Corpus Christi, was a major stop on the defunct San Antonio, Uvalde and Gulf Railroad, a Class I line, which operated from 1909 until it was merged into the Missouri Pacific Railroad in 1956.

More recently, Carrizo Springs has become the home of the only olive orchard and oil press in Texas.

Geography

Carrizo Springs is located at  (28.526699, –99.862423).

Climate

Carrizo Springs experiences a hot semi-arid climate with mild winters and hot summers. During the spring season, as well occasionally during the fall season, severe thunderstorms often build on the Serranias Del Burro to the distant west of Carrizo Springs.  This is believed to occur due to the uplift of moisture from the Gulf of Mexico which is channeled along the Rio Grande River.

Demographics

2020 census

As of the 2020 United States census, there were 4,892 people, 1,709 households, and 1,243 families residing in the city.

2000 census
As of the census of 2000, 5,655 people, 1,816 households, and 1,450 families were residing in the city. The population density was 1,812.9 people per mi2 (699.8/km). The 2,109 housing units averaged 676.1 per mi2 (261.0/km). The racial makeup of the city was 75.3% White, 1.3% African American, 0.7% Native American, 1.1% Asian,  19.0% from other races, and 2.6% from two or more races.  Hispanics or Latinos of any race were 87.2% of the population.

Of the 1,816 households, 43.2% had children under the age of 18 living with them, 54.0% were married couples living together, 20.0% had a female householder with no husband present, and 20.1% were not families. About 17.7% of all households were made up of individuals, and 9.5% had someone living alone who was 65 or older. The average household size was 3.06, and the average family size was 3.47.

In the city, the age distribution was 33.3% under 18, 9.7% from 18 to 24, 25.0% from 25 to 44, 18.8% from 45 to 64, and 13.2% who were 65 or older. The median age was 31 years. For every 100 females, there were 91.8 males. For every 100 females age 18 and over, there were 88.3 males.

Males had a median income of $24,536 versus $15,000 for females. The per capita income for the city was $8,642. About 30.8% of families and 33.8% of the population were below the poverty line, including 42.9% of those under age 18 and 29.9% of those age 65 or over.

Education 
Carrizo Springs is served by the Carrizo Springs Consolidated Independent School District and home to the Carrizo Springs High School Wildcats.

These schools serve students in the city:
 Carrizo Springs High School
 Carrizo Springs Junior High School
 Carrizo Springs Intermediate School
 Carrizo Springs Elementary School

Migrant child detention center 
Facilities that previously housed Stratton Oilfield Systems were chosen for a new unaccompanied minor detention site, with an estimated capacity of 1,000 to 1,600 children. Operations are contracted with BCFS Health and Human Services. When the site was previously considered under Stratton Security management, owner and president Dan Stratton assured the area's residents that potential residents would not be refugees of the Syrian Civil War or speak Arabic. He emphasized that refugees would be securely kept within the facility and would not interact with or murder area residents. The site opened for one month in 2019 and later reopened in February 2021.

In March 2022, Border Patrol agents declared "no vacancy" and plans to release migrants who cleared background and criminal checks in the city of Carrizo Springs.

Gallery

Notes

References

External links

 Handbook of Texas Online article about Carrizo Springs
 Carrizo Springs CISD Website

Cities in Texas
Cities in Dimmit County, Texas
County seats in Texas